Brehaut is a surname derived from the French Bréhaut, and ultimately of Germanic origin.

Prevalence
The region of highest relative prevalence (density) is Guernsey, in the Channel Islands but is not believed to be derived from the French Bréhaut. The countries with the highest absolute prevalence are France, Canada, the United States, Australia and England.

Variants
Variants include Berhaut, Brehat, Brehart, Brehault, Breheret, Brehier, and Burhoe.

Notable people
Notable people with this surname include:
 Ashley Brehaut, Australian badminton player
 Greg Brehaut, Australian football player
 Jeff Brehaut, American golfer
 Pierre Brehaut, Canadian businessman
 Richard Brehaut, American American football player
 Stanley Bréhaut Ryerson, Canadian historian
 Stuart Brehaut, Australian badminton player

References